The 1981 Yale Bulldogs football team represented Yale University in the 1981 NCAA Division I-A football season. The Bulldogs were led by 17th-year head coach Carmen Cozza and played their home games at the Yale Bowl. They played as a member of the Ivy League. The Bulldogs finished the season with an overall record of 9–1, including a record of 6–1 in Ivy League play, giving them a share of the Ivy League championship with Dartmouth.

Schedule

References

Yale
Yale Bulldogs football seasons
Ivy League football champion seasons
Yale Bulldogs football